A revetment, in military aviation, is a parking area for one or more aircraft that is surrounded by blast walls on three sides. These walls are as much about protecting neighbouring aircraft as it is to protect the aircraft within the revetment; if a combat aircraft fully loaded with fuel and munitions was to somehow ignite, by accident or design, then this risks starting a chain reaction as the destruction of an individual aircraft could easily set ablaze its neighbours. The blast walls around a revetment are designed to channel any blast and damage upwards and outwards, away from neighbouring aircraft.

Blast pen

 

The longer spine section behind the parking areas usually encloses a narrow corridor for aircrew and servicing personnel to employ as an air raid shelter.

Existing examples may still be seen at the present Kenley Aerodrome and at North Weald Airfield, although some pens have had their second bay removed over the years, thus becoming U-shaped rather than E-shaped. There are also a large number at the former RAF Catterick, and some at RAF Wittering. The Imperial War Museum Duxford has one that is accessible to the public. While common on Fighter Command airfields, other RAF Stations such as RAF Benson and RAF Brize Norton did not have any blast pens.

Gallery

See also

 Revetment (a sloped wall)
 Hardened aircraft shelter

Bibliography 
 

Military airbases
Fortifications by type